Fedir Yozhefovich Medvid also known as Ferents Medvid was a Ukrainian and Soviet football player.

Medvid was born on 5 January 1943 in Újdávidháza, Hungary (today in the Zakarpattia Oblast of Ukraine). He died on 8 November 1997 in Kyiv, Ukraine.

Honours
 Soviet Top League winner: 1966, 1967, 1968, 1971.
 Soviet Cup winner: 1964, 1966.

International career
Medvid made his debut for USSR on 23 October 1966 in a friendly against East Germany.

See also
 Vyacheslav Medvid

Notes and references

Notes:

References:

External links
  Profile

1943 births
1997 deaths
Soviet footballers
Soviet Union international footballers
Soviet Top League players
FC Hoverla Uzhhorod players
FC Dynamo Kyiv players
FC Bukovyna Chernivtsi managers
Soviet people of Hungarian descent
Ukrainian people of Hungarian descent
Association football midfielders
Ukrainian football managers
Sportspeople from Zakarpattia Oblast